SAFE Act may refer to:
 Secure and Fair Enforcement Banking Act (SAFE Banking Act of 2019), a bill to improve access to banking and financial services for cannabis businesses
 Secure and Fair Enforcement for Mortgage Licensing Act of 2008
 Securing Adolescents From Exploitation-Online Act of 2007.
 Security and Freedom Ensured Act of 2003.
 American Safety Against Foreign Enemies Act of 2015, the legislation requiring background investigations for refugees
 Safe Aviation Flight Enhancement Act, proposed in the US House of Representatives for deployable flight recorders
 Security and Freedom Through Encryption Act of 1999

 Save Adolescents From Experimentation (SAFE) Act of 2021, an Arkansas law banning doctors from providing gender-affirming healthcare to transgender youth
 New York Secure Ammunition and Firearms Enforcement Act (NY SAFE Act) of 2013, the New York gun control legislation
 Secure and Fair Elections Act, Kansas's Voter identification law, enacted in 2011

See also 
 SAFE-T Act of 2021, an Illinois law pertaining to the criminal justice system